Repka (Slovak feminine: Repková) or Řepka (Czech feminine: Řepková) is a surname of Slovak and Czech origin. Notable people with the surname include:

 Attila Repka (born 1968), Hungarian wrestler
 Christopher Repka (born 1998), Slovak chess grandmaster
 Ed Repka (born 1960), American artist
 Eva Repková (born 1975), Slovak chess player
 František Repka (born 1966), Slovak skier
 Lionel Repka (1935–2015), Canadian ice hockey player
 Tomáš Řepka (born 1974), Czech footballer

References

See also
 

Surnames of Slovak origin
Surnames of Czech origin